Pieces of a Dream may refer to:
 Pieces of a Dream (Anastacia album), 2005
 "Pieces of a Dream" (Anastacia song), 2005
 "Pieces of a Dream" (Chemistry song), 2001
 Pieces of a Dream (band), a jazz fusion group
 Pieces of a Dream (Pieces of a Dream album), 1981